Pieter Gerbrands Jr. (27 April 1909 – 11 November 1962) was a Dutch long-distance runner. He competed in the men's 5000 metres at the 1928 Summer Olympics.

References

External links
 

1909 births
1962 deaths
Athletes (track and field) at the 1928 Summer Olympics
Dutch male long-distance runners
Olympic athletes of the Netherlands
Place of birth missing
20th-century Dutch people